The Nations, Nationalities, and Peoples' Day is a national holiday in Ethiopia coincided for ethnic groups of Ethiopia since fully guaranteed under Federal Democratic Republic of Ethiopia Constitution on 8 December 1994. Officially started observation in 2006, the day affirms economic and political affinity and equal rights of the "nations of Ethiopia" by culture and language with harmony and tolerance.

In this case, the Day celebrating on 8 December. During opening ceremony, former Prime Minister Meles Zenawi said that "the Day is an occasion in which the Ethiopian Nations, Nationalities and Peoples make a solemn to develop their language and culture and also forge strong cooperation."  

Celebration includes festivals participating the country's eighty ethnic groups gathering in every cities and dancing with their music and traditional attire to demonstrate unity and diversity. High-profile government officials also presented at the event.

References

Public holidays in Ethiopia